The Peru national football team has represented Peru in international football since 1927. Their first match came against Uruguay at the 1927 South American Championship. As of September 2019, Peru has played 645 matches with 212 wins, 157 draws, and 276 losses.

2000

2001

2002
Peru played no friendlies in 2002.

2003

2004

2005

2006

2007

2008

2009

2010

2011

2012

2013

2014

2015

2016

2017

2018

2019

See also
Peru national football team results (2020–present)

Notes

References

Peru national football team results